Séamus Egan is an Irish-American musician.

Early days
Séamus Egan was born in Hatboro, Pennsylvania to Irish immigrants Mike and Ann Egan. At the age of three his parents moved the family back home to County Mayo, Ireland.

He learned accordion from Martin Donaghue. He saw Matt Molloy and James Galway on television and suddenly decided to take up the Irish flute. Seamus had won the all-Ireland championship on four different instruments by the time he was 14.

Later work
When Mick Moloney founded Green Fields of America in 1977, Seamus joined up and took lessons from Mick on the banjo. Two years later he returned to Ireland and won the All-Ireland championship on banjo and mandolin. In 1985 he recorded a solo album Traditional Music Of Ireland.

In 1992 he joined Susan McKeown's band The Chanting House and appeared on a live album with them. Eileen Ivers was also a member of the band. In 1994 he founded Solas and has been on every one of their albums. In 1995 he recorded music for the quirky low-budget film The Brothers McMullen, directed by Edward Burns. He also co-wrote the hit "I Will Remember You" with Dave Merenda and Sarah McLachlan.

Egan is also the producer for Solas and has worked as producer for other artists, including American singer-songwriter Antje Duvekot, fiddler Liz Carroll, and singer Karan Casey.

Family
He has a younger sister named Rory who is a very good concertina player.  She graduated from St. Francis Xavier University in Antigonish, Nova Scotia, Canada.
He has another sister named Siobhan who was the chief fiddle player in Cherish the Ladies for many years.

Discography

Solo albums
 Traditional Music Of Ireland	(1985)
 A Week In January		(1990)
 When Juniper Sleeps		(1996)
 Early Bright		(2020)

Seamus Egan, Eugene O'Donnell & Mick Moloney
 Three Way Street		(1993)

As session musician
 The Brothers McMullen (Soundtrack)  (1995)
 Eileen Ivers, Wild Blue (1996)
 Celtic Tapestry		(1999)

With Solas
 Solas					(1996)
 Sunny Spells and Scattered Showers	(1997)
 The Words That Remain			(1998)
 The Hour Before Dawn			(2000)
 The Edge of Silence			(2002)
 Another Day				(2003)
 Waiting for an Echo			(2005)
 Reunion-A Decade of Solas (CD/DVD)    (2006)
 For Love and Laughter                 (2008)
 The Turning Tide                      (2010)
 Shamrock City                         (2013)
 All These Years                  (2016)

References

External links

irishphiladelphia.com Interview

1969 births
American emigrants to Ireland
American people of Irish descent
Living people
Musicians from County Mayo
People from Hatboro, Pennsylvania
Songwriters from Pennsylvania